Jamie Lee Thurston is an American country music singer. He was raised in Waterbury, Vermont and performed with his father starting at age 15. After moving to Los Angeles, California, he moved again to Nashville, Tennessee in 1999.

In 2003, he released the album I Just Wanna Do My Thing via View 2. The album included the single "It Can All Be Gone", which peaked at number 59 on the Hot Country Songs charts. He later signed to Warner Bros. Records Nashville, then to Country Thunder.

Thurston wrote Rodney Atkins' 2009 single "15 Minutes", and cuts by Trace Adkins and Montgomery Gentry. In 2013, Thurston appeared on Game Show Network's Family Trade to compose a jingle for G. Stone Motors in exchange for a new truck. The jingle, "We Trade for Anything" was also used as the show's opening credits theme music.

Thurston's life is the basis of a screenplay co-written by Tim Rhys, the founder of MovieMaker magazine.

Discography

Albums

Singles

Music videos

References

External links
Official website

American country singer-songwriters
American male singer-songwriters
Living people
Singers from Vermont
People from Montpelier, Vermont
Warner Records artists
Year of birth missing (living people)